Rahjerd-e Sharqi Rural District is a rural district (dehestan) in Salafchegan District, Qom County, Qom Province, Iran. At the 2006 census, its population was 4,608, in 1,435 families.  The rural district has 32 villages.

References 

Rural Districts of Qom Province
Qom County